Mark Pilgrim (20 September 1969 – 5 March 2023) was a South African media personality who hosted numerous radio and television shows, most notably as a DJ on 5FM, Eastrand-oos Rand stereo, 94.7 Highveld Stereo, 94.5 Kfm, Hot919 and Hot102.7fm. On television, he hosted both seasons of Big Brother South Africa, the first season of Big Brother Africa, and the MNET game show Power of 10.

Radio career
Pilgrim started his radio career on Voice of Wits campus radio in the 80s. He joined 5FM in 1995. In 2003 he left 5fm and joined 94.7 Highveld Stereo in Johannesburg. In October 2007, Pilgrim hosted a chart show broadcast on two radio stations simultaneously (KFM and 94.7). He retired from radio at the end of June 2014, but made a comeback several months later on the all new Hot 91.9FM in Johannesburg, initially just doing a Saturday morning show 9 am – noon, but eventually coming back to radio full time and also doing Monday to Friday 9 am – noon. In 2015, he won an MTN Radio Award for Best Weekend Radio Show in South Africa, and in 2019 won the Liberty Radio Award for the Best Daytime Show in South Africa. In 2021, he was inducted into the South African Radio Awards Hall of Fame for his contribution to the radio industry. In 2022, Pilgrim formed part of 13 nominations in the "2022 SA Radio Awards" and won the “Best Weekend Radio Show in South Africa” for which he received a standing ovation in celebration of his success.

Television career
 New Moves (e-TV: 1999–2000)
 Big Brother South Africa 1 (MNET: 2001)
 Big Brother South Africa 2 (MNET: 2002)
 Big Brother Africa (DStv: 2003)
 Retail Therapy (MNET: 2002–2005)
 Face 2 Face (SABC2: 2004)
 Sex Etc. (MNET: 2005)
 Blue Wave (CORPORATE: 2004–2018)
 What's Brewing (CORPORATE: 2007–2008)
 Power of 10 (MNET: 2008)

Other work

Pilgrim was a regular DJ at corporate functions and nightclubs around the country.

As a voice artist, he spent many hours in post-production studios, narrating radio and TV commercials. He performed as an MC for numerous corporate gala evenings.

He was a motivational speaker, sharing his story on testicular cancer, how he overcame it and how it pushed him to follow his dreams.

Consumer researcher

Before getting involved in the entertainment industry, Pilgrim completed a B.Com. in Industrial Psychology and Business Economics, and was a quantitative consumer researcher for nine years. He started at Market Research Africa, and then moved onto Research International and finally Kauffman Levine. He was also the Johannesburg Chairman of the South African Market Research Association (SAMRA).

Personal life
Pilgrim was diagnosed with stage 3 testicular cancer in 1988. It was an aggressive form of cancer and spread to his lungs and kidneys. After 9 months of chemotherapy, he was declared to be in remission. He later was an ambassador for CANSA (Cancer Association of South Africa) and a friend of the Reach for a Dream Foundation.

On 14 July 2008, Pilgrim suffered a sudden and severe heart attack in his doctor's office. Although he suffered permanent heart damage (10% of his heart has lost its functionality), immediate medical intervention saved his life.

Pilgrim married Nicole Torres in Mauritius on 7 July 2007 and after almost 13 years together, filed for divorce in 2020. Their first daughter Tayla-Jean was born in April 2010, followed by their second daughter Alyssa in 2012.

Pilgrim went on to meet Adrienne Watkins, through mutual friends and dated Adrienne from 2020. He proposed to her on the 31st of December 2022 at their home in Johannesburg.

Pilgrim completed his Masters in Business Administration (MBA) through Edinburgh Business School (Heriot-Watt University in the United Kingdom) in 2020.

Death
In February 2022, Pilgrim was again diagnosed with cancer, this time stage 4 lung cancer. After a courageous battle which he faced with great dignity and bravery, he died on 5 March 2023 at home, with Adrienne by his side, at the age of 53.

References

External links
 
 
 
 94.7 Highveld Stereo's website
 94.5 Kfm's website
 Mark Pilgrim's website
 Hot919's website

1969 births
2023 deaths
South African game show hosts
South African television personalities
South African radio presenters
 South African people of English descent
University of South Africa alumni
English emigrants to South Africa
People from Kent
White South African people
Deaths from lung cancer in South Africa